Kietlanka is a village in the Masovian Voivodeship, Poland, located in the Gmina Zaręby Kościelne, Ostrów County. In 2011, it was inhabited by 180 people.

References

Kietlanka